Kristoffer Ventura (born 24 February 1995) is a Norwegian professional golfer who plays on the Korn Ferry Tour.

Amateur career
Born in Puebla, Mexico to a Mexican father and Norwegian mother, Ventura spent his first years in Mexico before moving to Rygge, Norway, aged 12. As an amateur, he represented Norway at the 2012 and 2016 Eisenhower Trophy, and represented Europe in the 2010 Junior Ryder Cup and the Continent of Europe in the 2011 and 2013 Jacques Léglise Trophy. He was runner-up at the 2011 European Young Masters and won the 2011 French International Boys Championship and the 2012 French Boys Championship. He attended the WANG Toppidrett Golf School in Oslo, before playing collegiate golf at Oklahoma State University where he was teammates with Viktor Hovland and Matthew Wolff and member of the 2018 NCAA Division I Men's Golf Championship team.

Professional career
In November 2018, just before final stage of Korn Ferry Tour Qualifying Tournament, Ventura was forced to have an emergency appendectomy. He competed in the event, despite not being able to swing fully, and finished near the bottom, entering the 2019 Korn Ferry Tour season with minimal status. He won the Utah Championship and Pinnacle Bank Championship and earned PGA Tour membership by finishing fourth on the Korn Ferry Tour regular season points list, entering the 2020 PGA Tour  14th in the final priority ranking. After a few weeks on the PGA Tour he moved into the top 150 on the Official World Golf Ranking in October 2019.

Amateur wins
2011 Trophee Carlhian (French International Boys Championship), Titleist Tour 2
2012 French Boys Championship, Norgesmesterskapet
2013 Team Norway Junior Tour 8 Superfinale
2014 Titleist Tour 3, International Trophy
2016 The Aggie Invitational, NCAA Stillwater Regional
2018 Big 12 Championship

Sources:

Professional wins (2)

Korn Ferry Tour wins (2)

Korn Ferry Tour playoff record (1–0)

Results in The Players Championship

CUT = missed the halfway cut

Team appearances
Amateur
European Boys' Team Championship (representing Norway): 2010, 2011, 2012, 2013
Junior Ryder Cup (representing Europe): 2010
Eisenhower Trophy (representing Norway): 2012, 2016
Jacques Léglise Trophy (representing the Continent of Europe): 2011, 2013
European Amateur Team Championship (representing Norway): 2016, 2017
Arnold Palmer Cup (representing Europe): 2017

Sources:

See also
2019 Korn Ferry Tour Finals graduates

References

External links
 
 

Norwegian male golfers
Oklahoma State Cowboys golfers
PGA Tour golfers
Korn Ferry Tour graduates
Sportspeople from Puebla
Sportspeople from Oslo
People from Rygge
1995 births
Living people